Zeamordella caprai is a species of beetle in the genus Zeamordella of the family Mordellidae. It was described in 1993.

References

Mordellidae
Beetles described in 1993